Fédération Nationale des Gîtes de France is an organization that lists and rates the quality campgrounds, bed and breakfasts and self catering gites.

History 

Gîtes de France was founded in 1955 by Émile Aubert.

References

External links 

 

Tourism in France
Hospitality companies of France